Braula is a genus of flies (Diptera) in the family Braulidae. These are very unusual flies, wingless and flattened, and barely recognizable as Diptera. Braula coeca Nitzsch is a pest of honey bees.  The larvae tunnel through the wax honeycomb and the adults are found on the bodies of honey bees.  There is some debate whether the bee louse causes damage to the honey bee. These flies sometimes can be found at places where bees congregate such as flowers or salt licks, waiting to grab onto hosts from uninfested nests. 
Braula is cosmopolitan and about 1.6 mm in length.

Species
Braula coeca Nitzsch, 1818
Braula kohli Schmitz, 1914
Braula orientalis Òròsi Pál, 1963
Braula pretoriensis Òròsi Pál, 1939
Braula schmitzi Òròsi Pál, 1939

References

External links
Braula coeca, bee louse on the University of Florida / Institute of Food and Agricultural Sciences Featured Creatures website
Photograph of a bee louse

Braulidae
Western honey bee pests
Carnoidea genera
Diptera of Europe
Diptera of Africa
Diptera of Asia
Diptera of North America
Diptera of South America
Diptera of Australasia
Wingless Diptera
Taxa named by Christian Ludwig Nitzsch